Thet Htar Thuzar (born 15 March 1999) is a Burmese badminton player. She participated at the 2013 Southeast Asian Games in her home country Myanmar. She won her first International title at the Egypt International 2018. As of 2019 she had reached eight finals, most of them in the African Badminton Circuit, winning six events (in Uganda, Kenya, Mauritius, Benin, Ivory Coast and again in Egypt).

Early life and training 
Born in 1999 in Yangon, a career in badminton was always in the cards for Thet Htar; she was born to parents who are both badminton players. She first picked up a badminton racket when she was seven years old. Thet Htar was raised briefly in Thailand since her father was serving as a coach there. She juggled sports and studies in Thailand and won third prize in her first competition at the age of seven. Then she returned to Myanmar with her family in 2010 and trained more enthusiastically while handling her academic studies. Shortly after her return to her motherland, she was selected to represent the Yangon Region in the Regions and States Tournament and won the best player award. Then, she started competing in open tournaments and was enlisted in the National team. She was only 11 when she participated in the 2011 Southeast Asian Games. Although she did not emerge victorious at her international debut, Thet Htar had now fallen in love with the taste of competition. She experiences every tournament as a challenge. Besides her skills and success in badminton, her generous smile and classic Myanmar brunette looks have made Thet Htar a Myanmar sweetheart, gaining a huge fan base both online and offline. Prior to the Tokyo Olympics she took part in the Asia Olympic Project, which was a year-end regional training programme being held in Kuala Lumpur, Malaysia. She also participated for Myanmar at the 2013, 2017 and 2019 Southeast Asian Games. At the 2015 Southeast Asian Games she was absent, because the event conflicted with her schooling. She traveled as far as Africa and Europe to chase her Olympic dream.

Career 
Thet Htar Thuzar reached three semi-finals in 2019. At the India International Challenge losing a close contested match against Thai player Benyapa Aimsaard 20–22, 17–21, and the semi-finals at the Maldives International, where she lost after one hour and two minutes against Vũ Thị Trang of Vietnam 14–21, 21–15, 16–21. And also losing the semi-final at her home event, the Myanmar International to Indonesian Maharani Sekar Batari 15–21, 17–21. She participated at the 2019 Badminton Asia Championships in Wuhan, China. She lost the quarter finals of the 2019 Bulgarian Open to eventual winner Neslihan Yiğit of Turkey in a 57 minutes marathon match 12–21, 21–19, 18–21.

Olympian 
Thet Htar Thuzar qualified and participated at the 2020 Tokyo Olympics in July 2021.
She lost both her Group M women's singles matches against 14th seed Gregoria Mariska Tunjung of Indonesia (11–21, 8–21) and Lianne Tan of Belgium (6–21, 8–21).

World Championship participation 
After the Olympics she played her last match during the round of 64 of the 2021 BWF World Championships losing 15–21, 16–21 to Chinese Taipei player Pai Yu-po.

Achievements

BWF International Challenge/Series (8 titles, 3 runners-up) 
Women's singles

  BWF International Challenge tournament
  BWF International Series tournament
  BWF Future Series tournament

References

External links
 
 

Living people
1999 births
Sportspeople from Yangon
Burmese female badminton players
Badminton players at the 2020 Summer Olympics
Olympic badminton players of Myanmar
Competitors at the 2011 Southeast Asian Games
Competitors at the 2013 Southeast Asian Games
Competitors at the 2017 Southeast Asian Games
Competitors at the 2019 Southeast Asian Games
Southeast Asian Games competitors for Myanmar